The MM algorithm is an iterative optimization method which exploits the convexity of a function in order to find its maxima or minima. The MM stands for “Majorize-Minimization” or “Minorize-Maximization”, depending on whether the desired optimization is a minimization or a maximization. Despite the name, MM itself is not an algorithm, but a description of how to construct an optimization algorithm.

The expectation–maximization algorithm can be treated as a special case of the MM algorithm.
However, in the EM algorithm conditional expectations are usually involved, while in the MM algorithm convexity and inequalities are the main focus, and it is easier to understand and apply in most cases.

History
The historical basis for the MM algorithm can be dated back to at least 1970, when Ortega and Rheinboldt were performing studies related to line search methods. The same concept continued to reappear in different areas in different forms. In 2000, Hunter and Lange put forth "MM" as a general framework. Recent studies have applied the method in a wide range of subject areas, such as mathematics, statistics, machine learning and engineering.

Algorithm

The MM algorithm works by finding a surrogate function that minorizes or majorizes the objective function. Optimizing the surrogate function will either improve the value of the objective function or leave it unchanged.

Taking the minorize-maximization version, let  be the objective concave function to be maximized. At the  step of the algorithm, the constructed function  will be called the minorized version of the objective function (the surrogate function) at  if

    
    

    

The above iterative method will guarantee that  will converge to a local optimum or a saddle point as  goes to infinity. By the above construction
   

Majorize-Minimization is the same procedure but with a convex objective to be minimised.

Constructing the surrogate function
One can use any inequality to construct the desired majorized/minorized version of the objective function. Typical choices include
 Jensen's inequality
 Convexity inequality
 Cauchy–Schwarz inequality
 Inequality of arithmetic and geometric means
 Quadratic majorization/mininorization via second order Taylor expansion of twice-differentiable functions with bounded curvature.

References

Optimization algorithms and methods